Konec starých časů is a Czech novel, written by Vladislav Vančura. It was first published in 1934. A film based on the novel was released in 1989.

References

External links

1934 Czech novels